Khumdon (formerly Navdonak;) is a village and jamoat in central Tajikistan. It is located in Nurobod District, one of the Districts of Republican Subordination.

Geography
Khumdon is east of Dushanbe on the Pamir Highway, in the Vakhsh River valley and has a Köppen climate classification of Dsa and experiences wet and cold winters with dry cool summers. The town is both a river crossing and highway junction.

History
During the 1920s the area was a hotbed for the Basmachi, the anti-Soviet resistance in Central Asia.

During the Civil War in Tajikistan from 1992 to 1997, the area was a hotbed for Islamist forces, and October 2010, the Tajik Interior Ministry asserted it had killed three militants nearby at Gharm amid an alleged rise in Islamic militancy in the region.

References

Populated places in Districts of Republican Subordination
Jamoats of Tajikistan